Ust-Burgaltay is a rural locality (an ulus) in Zakamensky District, Republic of Buryatia, Russia. The population was 394 as of 2010. There are 8 streets.

Geography 
Ust-Burgaltay is located 69 km east of Zakamensk (the district's administrative centre) by road. Mikhaylovka is the nearest rural locality.

References 

Rural localities in Zakamensky District